Roman Mrázek (born January 21, 1962 in Sokolov) is a race walker who represented Czechoslovakia and later Slovakia. He represented his former nation at the 1988 Summer Olympics and the 1992 Summer Olympics, before competing for Slovakia at the 1996 Summer Olympics.

International competitions

References

1962 births
Living people
People from Sokolov
Slovak male racewalkers
Czechoslovak male racewalkers
Olympic athletes of Czechoslovakia
Athletes (track and field) at the 1988 Summer Olympics
Athletes (track and field) at the 1992 Summer Olympics
Olympic athletes of Slovakia
Athletes (track and field) at the 1996 Summer Olympics
World Athletics Championships athletes for Czechoslovakia
World Athletics Championships athletes for Slovakia
World Athletics Indoor Championships medalists